Albert Kuqi (born 14 February 1992) is a Finnish former football player who played as a forward.

He scored his first goal For EIF in his debut against FC Espoo with a volley from 25 yards.

He is the younger brother of footballers Shefki Kuqi and Njazi Kuqi. They are of Kosovo Albanian descent.

References
  Profile at veikkausliiga.com
  Veikkausliiga Hall of Fame
  Kuqi loppukaudeksi lainalle Gnistaniin

Notes

1992 births
Living people
Finnish footballers
FC Haka players
Veikkausliiga players
Ekenäs IF players
Finnish people of Kosovan descent
Klubi 04 players
FC Viikingit players
Pallokerho Keski-Uusimaa players
IF Gnistan players
Association football forwards
Finnish people of Albanian descent
People from Mikkeli
Sportspeople from South Savo